Novoselci may refer to:

 Novoselci, Bosnia and Herzegovina, a village near Dubica, Bosnia and Herzegovina
 Novoselci, Požega-Slavonia County, a village near Pleternica, Croatia
 Novoselci, Sisak-Moslavina County, a village near Sunja, Croatia